Hebomoia is a genus of butterflies in the family Pieridae. There are two widespread, strong-flying southeast Asian species that are among the largest pierids.

Species
Hebomoia glaucippe (Linnaeus, 1758) – great orange tip
Hebomoia leucippe (Cramer, 1775)

References

External links
images representing Hebomoia at Consortium for the Barcode of Life

Anthocharini
Pieridae genera
Taxa named by Jacob Hübner